The Battle of Laredo was fought during the American Civil War. Laredo, Texas was a main route to export cotton to Mexico on behalf of the Confederate States. On March 18, 1864, Major Alfred F. Holt led a Union force from Brownsville, Texas, to destroy 5,000 bales of cotton stacked at the San Agustín Plaza. Colonel Santos Benavides commanded 42 Confederate soldiers and repelled three Union attacks at Zacate Creek. Colonel Santos Benavides secured passage of the 5,000 cotton bales into Mexico.

External links

 Report of Colonel Santos Benavides, Texas Cavalry

References

Laredo
Laredo
Laredo
Webb County, Texas
History of Laredo, Texas
Laredo
1864 in Texas
March 1864 events